Marcel Bär (born 8 June 1992) is a German professional footballer who plays as a winger for 1860 Munich.

References

External links
 

Living people
1992 births
People from Gifhorn
German footballers
Footballers from Lower Saxony
Association football midfielders
2. Bundesliga players
3. Liga players
Regionalliga players
Eintracht Braunschweig II players
FC Carl Zeiss Jena players
FSV Zwickau players
VfR Aalen players
Eintracht Braunschweig players
TSV 1860 Munich players